Mangol may refer to:
 Mangol, Bushehr
 Mangol, Mazandaran
 Mangol, West Azerbaijan